Breitner is a surname. Notable people with the surname include:

 George Hendrik Breitner (1857–1923), Dutch painter and photographer
 Paul Breitner (born 1951), German footballer and commentator

See also
 Breitner Da Silva (born 1989), Venezuelan footballer

German-language surnames